Grevillea arenaria , commonly known as sand grevillea is a species of flowering plant in the family Proteaceae and is endemic to New South Wales. It is a spreading shrub with elliptic to egg-shaped leaves with the narrower end towards the base, and red, pink or orange flowers.

Description
Flowers are present in most months with a peak in spring.

Taxonomy
Grevillea arenaria was first formally described in 1810 by Robert Brown in  Transactions of the Linnean Society of London from specimens collected near Port Jackson.

The names of two subspecies are accepted by the Australian Plant Census:
 Grevillea arenaria subsp. canescens (R.Br.)

Distribution and habitat
This grevillea grows in open forest, often in rocky places, near creeks or cliffs in south-eastern New South Wales. Subspecies arenaria mostly occurs on the eastern side of the Great Dividing Range and nearby ranges from Richmond to the Deua River and subspecies canescens is mostly found on the drier, western side of the ranges, from Tamworth and Gilgandra to Bathurst and western parts of the Blue Mountains.

References

External links
Grevillea arenaria: Images and occurrence data from Atlas of Living Australia

arenaria
Flora of New South Wales
Proteales of Australia
Taxa named by Robert Brown (botanist, born 1773)
Plants described in 1810